Éric Lalouette (born 5 December 1951) is a French former professional racing cyclist. His sporting career began with La Hutte-Gitane. He rode in the 1976 Tour de France.

References

External links
 

1951 births
Living people
French male cyclists
Sportspeople from Abbeville
Cyclists from Hauts-de-France